Anne Pyne Cowley is an American astronomer known for her spectroscopic observations of stars and stellar black holes, including the 1983 discovery of a likely black hole in LMC X-3, an X-ray binary star system in the Large Magellanic Cloud. This became the first known extragalactic stellar black hole, and the second known stellar black hole after Cygnus X-1. She is a professor emerita at Arizona State University.

Education and career
Cowley is a 1959 graduate of Wellesley College, where she became interested in astronomy after taking a general education course on the subject. She went to the University of Michigan for graduate study in astronomy, earned a Ph.D. there, and met her eventual husband, astronomer Charles R. Cowley.

She continued as a researcher at the University of Chicago until 1967, when she returned to the University of Michigan as a research scientist. In 1983, she took a professorship at Arizona State University.

Recognition
In 1986, Wellesley College gave Cowley their Alumnae Achievement Award. She was named a Legacy Fellow of the American Astronomical Society in 2020.

References

Year of birth missing (living people)
Living people
American astronomers
American women astronomers
Wellesley College alumni
University of Michigan alumni
Arizona State University faculty
Fellows of the American Astronomical Society